Rekola railway station is a Helsinki commuter rail station located in the district of Rekola in the city of Vantaa, Finland.

The Rekola station was moved to its current location in 1980, coinciding with the replacement of the Hanala station by the contemporary Koivukylä stop.

Connections
 K trains (Helsinki - Kerava)
 T trains (Helsinki - Riihimäki), nighttime

References

Railway stations in Vantaa